The Keys of Skies is a 1964 Soviet comedy film directed by Viktor Ivanov.

Plot 
In the center of the plot air defence missile regiment lieutenant Kirillov, rookie radio amateur Lagoda, a girl named Polina and doctor Anna, who are quarreling over trifles, reconcile and decide to get married.

Cast 
 Alexander Lenkov as Semyon Lagoda (as A. Lenkov)
 Valeriy Bessarab as Ivan Kirillov (as V. Bessarab)
 Zoya Vikhoryeva as Polina Repyakh (as Z. Vikhoryeva)
 Natalya Surovegina as Anya Petrenko (as N. Surovegina)
 Genrikh Ostashevsky as polkovnik Aleksandr Andreyev (as G. Ostashevskiy)
 Aleksandr Gai as mayor Olenin (as A. Gay)
 Andrey Gonchar as Vasiliy Filin (as A. Gonchar)
 Vyacheslav Voronin as Lieutenant Samsonov
 Vladimir Volkov as Lorry Driver
 V. Gavronskiy as Sergeant Major
Maria Kapnist as lab worker (uncredited)

References

External links 
 

1964 films
1960s Russian-language films
Soviet comedy films
1964 comedy films